Estádio Mauro Sampaio, also known as Romeirão, is a stadium in Juazeiro do Norte, Brazil. It has a maximum capacity of 16,000 spectators. It is the home of Associação Desportiva Recreativa e Cultural Icasa of the Série B.

References

Football venues in Ceará
Estadio Mauro Sampaio
Juazeiro do Norte